Karakol is a rural locality (a selo) in Elekmonarskoye Rural Settlement of Chemalsky District, the Altai Republic, Russia. The population was 5 as of 2016.

Geography 
The village is located 25 km from Elekmonar village.

References 

Rural localities in Chemalsky District